Indiranagar is a medium-sized neighbourhood in east Bangalore, Karnataka, India.  A cosmopolitan locality, Indiranagar is one of the most expensive neighbourhoods in Bangalore.

History
Indiranagar was formed as a BDA layout in the late 1970s, and was named after the former Prime Minister of India Indira Gandhi. In the beginning, the locality was primarily a suburb, dotted with large bungalows and independent houses, mostly owned by defence personnel and public sector employees.

The Information Technology boom in Bengaluru in the late 1990s converted Indiranagar and its two arterial roads (100 Feet Road and Chinmaya Mission Hospital Road) into a semi-commercial area. Today, Indiranagar is an important residential and commercial hub of Bengaluru.

Indiranagar is divided into 2 stages, with the 1st stage being the largest. The villages which existed prior to the formation of Indiranagar such as Binnamangala, Lakshmipuram, Motappanapalya, Appareddy Palya, Doopanahalli, Kodihalli and Thippasandra as well as the neighbouring BDA layouts such as HAL 2nd Stage and HAL 3rd Stage are often considered as a part of Indiranagar.

Community
The Indiranagar Sangeetha Sabha organises Music & Dance programmes. It also conducts promotional activities, seminars, puppet shows and annual cultural programmes such as vocal and instrumental music concerts. Sangeetha Sabha constructed Purandhara Bhavan which promotes performing arts, theatre and drama. Close to the Sangeetha Sabha one can find the Indiranagar Club spread across 2.5 acres of land. The membership fee is high at 10 lakh rupees and the club boasts of some of the best gym and work out equipment, yoga clubs, tennis courts, basketball ground, billiards tables, an exclusive cards room and a small library. Indiranagar has the Defence Colony Playground, located next to the Defence Colony Children's Park and the Old People's Park; the Defence Colony Park maintained by DECORA is close by. There are five big schools: Sree Cauvery School, Kairalee Niketan Edu Trust, National Public School, The Frank Anthony Public School and New Horizon Public School within the residential locality, as well as the Sri Rakum School for the Blind.
On top of this, Indiranagar is also famous for having 100 ft. road, which has several high end fashion brands as well as bars and pubs. This tends to be a major meeting point for people between the ages of 25-30.

Transport

The Namma Metro Purple Line runs through Indiranagar and has two stations within the neighbourhood – Indiranagar and Swami Vivekananda Road. Indiranagar is well connected to most areas of Bengaluru with the buses of the BMTC, which also maintains a bus depot in the area.

Localities
Localities of Indiranagar include Indiranagar 1st and 2nd stage, HAL 2nd and 3rd Stages, Doopanahalli, Mottappana Palya, Michaelpalya, Defence Colony, Jeevanbheemanagar, Kodihalli, Old Thippasandra.

References

Neighbourhoods in Bangalore
Monuments and memorials to Indira Gandhi